Havana syndrome is an alleged set of medical symptoms with unknown causes experienced mostly abroad by U.S. government officials and military personnel. The symptoms range in severity from pain and ringing in the ears to cognitive difficulties and were first reported in 2016 by U.S. and Canadian embassy staff in Havana, Cuba. Beginning in 2017, more people, including U.S. intelligence and military personnel and their families, reported having these symptoms in other places, such as China, New Delhi, India, Europe, and Washington, D.C.

The U.S. Department of State, Department of Defense, and other federal entities have referred to the events as "Anomalous Health Incidents" (AHI), while Central Intelligence Agency director William J. Burns has publicly called them attacks. While there is no expert consensus on the syndrome's cause, an expert committee of the National Academies of Sciences, Engineering, and Medicine concluded in December 2020 that microwave energy (specifically, directed pulsed RF energy) "appears to be the most plausible mechanism in explaining these cases among those that the committee considered", but that "each possible cause remains speculative". Other potential causes that have been proposed have included ultrasound, pesticides, or mass psychogenic illness.

Until March 2023, U.S. intelligence services had not reached a consensus on, or a formal determination of, the cause of Havana syndrome, though U.S. intelligence and government officials expressed suspicions to the press that Russian military intelligence was responsible. In January 2022, the Central Intelligence Agency issued an interim assessment concluding that the syndrome is not the result of "a sustained global campaign by a hostile power". Foreign involvement was ruled out in 976 cases of the 1,000 reviewed. In February 2022, a panel of experts assembled by the Biden administration released an executive summary stating that stress or psychosomatic reactions could not explain some of the incidents of Havana syndrome it had reviewed, and that radio waves could have caused some of the injuries of the CIA officers and diplomats. At roughly the same time, the State Department commissioned the JASON Advisory Group to investigate the cause. In February 2022, the State Department released the JASON report, which stated that it was unlikely that a directed energy attack had caused the health incidents.

In March 2023, seven U.S. intelligence agencies completed a review of the proposed cases of Havana Syndrome and released an unclassified report with the consensus that "available intelligence consistently points against the involvement of US adversaries in causing the reported incidents" and that the involvement of a foreign adversary was "very unlikely". Despite this report, Pentagon-funded experiments attempting to recreate Havana Syndrome in animals by exposing them to RF waves for extended periods were not ended.

The media coverage of Havana syndrome has been criticized for an unwillingness to challenge U.S. government claims, including its assertions about the use of a "mysterious, never invented microwave weapon".

Criticism of media coverage
Media coverage of Havana syndrome has been criticized for what some allege is a conspiratorial tone or journalists' unwillingness to question official explanations. In Jacobin Magazine, Branko Marcetic wrote, "anti-Cuban hawks, using the establishment press as their megaphone, have baselessly and incessantly claimed that the illness was actually the result of 'attacks' carried out by Washington's geopolitical adversaries, and using a mysterious, never invented microwave weapon". In January 2022, Ryan Cooper wrote in The Week that there is "shame on the great many journalists and members of Congress who stoked inflammatory, implausible claims about magic Russian ray guns". Robert Bartholomew, a medical sociologist specializing in mass psychogenic illness, has dismissed 60 Minutes reports of a "smoking gun" connecting Havana syndrome to a foreign power or technology: "there is only smoke and mirrors generated by bad science and poor journalism". In an interview with NPR, The New Republics Natalie Shure said it was a "red flag" as to its credibility that "this story was being almost exclusively pushed by national security reporters and not by people who report on health topics".

March 2023 U.S. intelligence agencies' report
Seven U.S. intelligence agencies headed by a "senior CIA officer" spent years reviewing thousands of possible cases of Havana Syndrome. An unclassified version of their report was released by the House Intelligence Committee on March 1, 2023. Five of the seven agencies concluded that "available intelligence consistently points against the involvement of US adversaries in causing the reported incidents" and that the involvement of a foreign adversary was "very unlikely". One of the agencies, Director of National Intelligence, considered foreign involvement in Anomalous Health Incidents "unlikely", and one agency declined to make a finding. CNN reported that government officials said: "There is no one explanation for these incidents. Instead, there are many different possible causes including environmental as well as social factors and preexisting medical conditions." The officials also told CNN that "The investigative efforts were 'extremely aggressive' and involved 'a high degree of risk'" and "Intelligence officers vigorously studied what happened in the hours, days and weeks surrounding the incidents... In some instances they found malfunctioning HVAC systems, which can cause discomfort to humans, and in other cases there were computer mice that created surprising disruptions... We weren’t finding what we expected to find... There is no one explanation for any of this."

Of the report, CIA Director Bill Burns said, "The intelligence community assessment released today by ODNI reflects more than two years of rigorous, painstaking collection, investigative work, and analysis by IC agencies including CIA... We applied the agency’s very best operational, analytic, and technical tradecraft to what is one of the largest and most intensive investigations in the agency’s history." Politico summarized the results by saying, "The finding undercuts a years-long narrative, propped up by more than a thousand reports from government employees, that a foreign adversary used pulsed electro-magnetic energy waves to sicken Americans."

When interviewed about Havana Syndrome and the report, neurologist Suzanne O'Sullivan said it is not uncommon for "psychogenic illness to cause paralysis, even put people into comas." She also said: "Havana Syndrome is a real disorder. It's not about being crazy... It's known that the mind can help influence the experience of pain and other symptoms."

Upon release of the report, Cuba's Vice Foreign Minister Carlos Fernandez de Cossio told Reuters, "The unfortunate thing is, the U.S. government leveraged [Havana Syndrome] to derail bilateral relations ... and discredit Cuba." Reuters also reported that "Cuba has for years labeled as 'science fiction' the idea that 'Havana Syndrome' resulted from an attack by a foreign agent, and its top scientists in 2021 found no evidence of such allegations."

Despite the conclusion of the report, U.S. Senator Marco Rubio, the Republican vice chairman of the Senate Intelligence Committee, issued a statement on March 2 rejecting the finding by the U.S. intelligence community, saying, "Something happened here, and just because you don’t have all the answers doesn’t mean that it didn’t happen." Rubio said his panel would continue an independent review of the claims.

Following release of the March 2023 report, Trump's national security adviser John Bolton revealed that when the Cuban attack reports began, he "pretty quickly" came to believe that this was not in Cuba's interest, and in any case thought it was beyond that nation's capabilities. He assumed Russia was involved, but said that he chose not to brief the president on that belief as he did not think Trump would support that theory due to his prior associations with Vladimir Putin.

Early U.S. government investigations
The U.S. State Department said in February 2021 that its ongoing investigation was "a high priority" for the department. Citing unnamed intelligence and government officials, The New York Times reported in July 2021 that the National Security Council, Central Intelligence Agency, and Director of National Intelligence established two outside panels, one to investigate potential causes and the other to develop defensive countermeasures for personnel protection; cleared external scientists would be permitted to view relevant classified intelligence in their investigations. In January 2022, the CIA issued a report on the interim findings of a comprehensive study of 1,000 cases. The report concludes that most cases can be attributed to environmental causes, undiagnosed medical conditions or stress rather than a persistent global campaign by a foreign power.

Russian responsibility hypothesis
Many current and former U.S. officials think Russia was likely responsible for the alleged attacks, a suspicion shared by both Trump and Biden administration officials. This view was shared by CIA analysts on Russia, State Department officials, outside science experts, and several of the alleged victims. Russia has a history of researching, developing, and using weapons that cause brain injuries, such as the Cold War-era "Moscow Signal" targeting the American embassy in Moscow. A 2014 NSA report raised suspicions that Russia used a microwave weapon to target a person's living quarters, causing nervous system damage; and Russia has an interest in disrupting cooperation among the U.S., China, and Cuba. The U.S. diplomats stationed in China and Cuba who reported ailments were working to increase cooperation with those countries, and some CIA analysts voiced suspicion Russia thus sought to derail their work.

In May 2021, Politico reported that three current and former U.S. officials "with direct knowledge of the discussions" said that the U.S. government suspected that Russia's military intelligence agency, GRU, was behind alleged attacks, although the U.S. Intelligence Community have not "reached a consensus or made a formal determination." In May 2021, The New Yorker reported that the U.S. government's "working hypothesis" was that GRU agents "have been aiming microwave-radiation devices at U.S. officials to collect intelligence from their computers and cell phones, and that these devices can cause serious harm to the people they target." The U.S. government has not publicly accused Russia; U.S. intelligence officials privately call the events "attacks" but publicly call them "anomalous health incidents." According to two officials interviewed by Politico, "While investigators have not determined definitively that these incidents are caused by a specific weapon, some believe any such device would be primarily transported by vehicle", and "Some could be small enough to fit into a large backpack, and an individual can be targeted from 500 to 1,000 yards away." James Lin of the University of Illinois, an expert on the biological effects of microwave energy, agreed that a Havana syndrome attack could be caused by a small apparatus that could fit in a van or SUV.

Within the U.S. government, analysts debated whether the alleged attacks reflected a deliberate attempt to cause injury or whether the reported symptoms were "a consequence of a high-tech attempt to steal classified information from phones and computers of U.S. officials."

A 2021 report in the New Yorker cited a number of incidents recounted by Mark Vandroff, who served as the senior director for defense policy at the National Security Council: "One of the most dramatic episodes involved a U.S. military officer stationed in a country with a large Russian presence. As the officer pulled his car into a busy intersection, he suddenly felt as though his head were going to explode. His two-year-old son, in a car seat in the back, started screaming. As the officer sped out of the intersection, the pressure in his head ceased, and his son went quiet. A remarkably similar incident was reported by a CIA officer who was stationed in the same city, and who had no connection to the military officer."

Trump administration and lapses in initial investigation 
In October 2020, the New York Times reported that U.S. diplomats and intelligence officers, including senior leaders, had clashed with Trump administration appointees, including CIA director Gina Haspel and State Department leaders, over the nature and causes of the suspected attacks. A Times investigation found that the State Department had "produced inconsistent assessments of patients and events, ignored outside medical diagnoses and withheld basic information from Congress." Despite the general view within the U.S. government that Russia was responsible, two U.S. officials told the Times that Haspel was not convinced of Russia's responsibility, or even whether an attack occurred.

A 2018 State Department report was declassified, and posted on the George Washington University's National Security Archive, after Freedom of Information Act litigation brought by the James Madison Project. The documents indicate that the State Department botched the handling of the initial reports. Peter Kornbluh of the National Security Archive noted that the 2018 report concluded that the department's "initial investigation assessment of what was going on" was marred by chaos, disorganization, and excessive secrecy. In 2021, sources familiar with the various ongoing investigations told CNN that a primary obstacle to progress by the U.S. government in investigating the syndrome was a lack of interagency coordination between the CIA, FBI, Centers for Disease Control and Prevention, and State Department, which conducted separate and "largely siloed" investigations. The limited coordination among the varying agencies was based in part on "the highly classified nature of some details and the privacy restrictions of health records, and that has hampered progress."

A U.S. Office of Special Counsel investigation resulted in an April 2020 determination that there was "a substantial likelihood of wrongdoing" by State Department leadership. Mark Lenzi, who was a State Department diplomatic security officer stationed in Guangzhou, accused the department of a "deliberate, high-level cover-up" and of failing to protect their employees. Marc Polymeropoulos, a 26-year CIA veteran, who retired in 2019, similarly felt betrayed by CIA leadership, accusing the agency of failing to respond appropriately to a vertigo-inducing incident in Moscow in December 2017 (Polymeropoulos said the event was an attack and "the most terrifying experience of my life", worse than experiences in Iraq and Afghanistan). Polymeropoulos fought with the CIA for years to obtain specialized medical treatment, after the agency cast doubt on the similarities between the symptoms he experienced and those experienced by the diplomats in Havana. Polymeropoulos was ultimately diagnosed at the U.S. government's Walter Reed Medical Center with traumatic brain injury; attorney Mark Zaid, who represented almost a dozen clients who had also become ill under similar circumstances, said that Polymeropoulos was the only one of his clients who had received treatment at Walter Reed, with others obtaining treatment only from personal doctors or academic medical centers.

Defense Department, State Department, and CIA task forces
Near the end of the Trump administration, the Defense Department established a task force to investigate reports of attacks on DoD personnel abroad. The DoD established the task force partly due to frustration over what DoD officials considered to be a sluggish and lackluster response by the CIA and Department of State. Christopher C. Miller, who was acting defense secretary at the time, said in 2021 that, "I knew CIA and Department of State were not taking this shit seriously and we wanted to shame them into it by establishing our task force." Miller said that he began to consider the reports of mysterious symptoms to be a high priority in December 2020, after he conducted an interview with a person with major combat experience who detailed symptoms.

In December 2020, the CIA established a task force to investigate. The agency set up the task force after continued reports of debilitating attacks against CIA officers in various places around the world. The CIA expanded its investigation under Director William J. Burns, who took office in 2021; Burns appointed a senior CIA officer who had previously led the manhunt for Osama bin Laden to lead the agency's investigation.

In March 2021, the State Department appointed Ambassador Pamela L. Spratlen, a career foreign service officer, to oversee the department task force charged with responding to the incidents. Six months later, Spratlen left her position as coordinator of the task force because she "reached the threshold of hours of labor" that she could perform as a retiree. Her resignation had been demanded by people angered by her handling of a conference call with affected employees. During the call with employees (in which Secretary of State Antony Blinken also took part), Spratlen did not take a position on whether the syndrome was psychogenic, a response that affected diplomats called "invalidating". In November 2021, Blinken appointed two senior U.S. diplomats to oversee the department's internal Health Incident Response Task Force: career foreign service officer Ambassador Jonathan Moore as overall coordinator and retired Ambassador Margaret Uyehara.

The Senate Intelligence Committee leadership (chair Mark Warner and vice chair Marco Rubio) said in 2021 that it was working with Burns and the CIA on connection with the investigation, saying, "We have already held fact finding hearings on these debilitating attacks, many of which result in medically confirmed cases of Traumatic Brain Injury, and will do more." In May 2021, Politico reported that intelligence officials had recently told Congress that the investigation had expanded to include all 18 federal intelligence agencies and had focused "on the potential involvement of GRU, the Russian spy agency". Following the release of the US intelligence agencies' March 2023 report which concluded that "available intelligence consistently points against the involvement of US adversaries in causing the reported incidents" and that the involvement of a foreign adversary was "very unlikely", Rubio issued a statement rejecting the finding by the U.S. intelligence community, saying, "Something happened here, and just because you don’t have all the answers doesn’t mean that it didn’t happen." Rubio also said his panel would continue an independent review of the claims.

In September 2021, CIA Deputy Director David S. Cohen said that the investigation had "gotten closer" to making a determination, "but not close enough to make the analytic judgment that people are waiting for."

The BBC wrote the syndrome has "a real impact on the country's ability to operate overseas", reporting that one official called the deciphering of the cause "the most difficult intelligence challenge they have ever faced."

After the reports of the incident at The Ellipse nearby the White House in Washington, Defense Department investigators briefed members of Congress, even though it occurred within the U.S.; this was because the DoD investigation was more advanced than the FBI or the intelligence community investigations.

In January 2022, the Central Intelligence Agency issued an interim assessment concluding that the syndrome is not the result of "a sustained global campaign by a hostile power" and that most cases could be explained by natural causes, although it couldn't rule out foreign involvement in approximately 24 cases, many of those from Havana.

JASON Report 
In 2021, the State Department commissioned the JASON Advisory Group, an outside panel, to perform a comprehensive investigation. It tasked JASON to consider all available data and evaluate mechanisms' ability to produce the reported effects. The State Department released unclassified portions of the JASON report in February 2022.

The report examined two broad questions:
 Are the events known as Anomalous Health Incidents (AHI) truly anomalous? In other words, is there a unique cluster of symptoms that exceed their prevalence in a comparable background population?
 Regardless of the answer to the first question, how consistent are the events with a directed energy attack or other physical mechanism? In other words, is it possible for there to be a single underlying cause that can be physiologically linked to the reported symptoms and physically linked to the incident reports?

On the first question, the report found that 80-90% of the incidents could be easily explained by everyday occurrences or other unrelated factors. For the 10-20% that could not be easily explained, JASON was not able to perform a statistical analysis due to lack of data on a comparable background population, small numbers, and generally low data quality.

On the second question, the report examined mechanisms related to electromagnetic energy (all frequencies, from RF to ionizing) and acoustic energy (infrasound, audible, and ultrasound). Ionizing radiation and acoustic energy were easily ruled out, as was RF energy at frequencies less than 500 MHZ or greater than 30 GHz. This left the region of RF energy in the 500 MHz to 3 GHz range, which was not easily ruled out.

Within this range, the report examined several factors derived from the incident reports as a whole, but focusing on the 10-20% of the incidents not easily explainable by everyday causes. These factors include the ability to create an RF beam that can: be focused to a degree consistent with the incident reports; penetrate a building; physiologically affect a human (to include the Frey effect); deliver sufficient power; and be transmitted from an antenna that would not be easily noticed. Considering all these factors, the report concluded that RF energy between 500 MHz and 30 GHz cannot be conclusively ruled out, but is "highly unlikely" to be the cause of the incidents.

Theories regarding cause

Unknown weaponry
On February 1, 2022, a declassified US intelligence report (IC Experts Panel on Anomalous Health Incidents) called pulsed electromagnetic energy and ultrasound plausible causes and said that concealable devices exist that could produce the observed symptoms.

However, in 2023 a US "Intelligence Community Assessment" which "updates the IC’s previous assessment on AHIs published in January 2022" said that there continues to be a scientific debate about whether or not there could be a weapon that produces such health effects. The Intelligence Community Assessment was lead by the CIA and involved seven US intelligence agencies which conducted "a review of intelligence reporting, open-source information, and scientific and medical literature about foreign weapons and research programs, as well as engagement with researchers inside and outside the US Government." That review led the agencies "to judge that there is no credible evidence that a foreign adversary has a weapon or collection device that is causing AHIs." Two of the seven agencies had "high confidence in this judgment while three agencies have moderate confidence." The remaining two agencies judged "that deliberate causal mechanisms are unlikely to have caused AHIs" but those two agencies had "low confidence because they judge(d) that radiofrequency (RF) energy is a plausible cause for AHIs, based in part on the findings of the IC Expert Panel and the results of research by some US laboratories."

Microwave weapon
In 2018, Douglas H. Smith, the lead author of a University of Pennsylvania study of 21 affected diplomats in Havana published in JAMA , said in an interview that microwaves were "considered a main suspect" underlying the phenomenon. A 2018 study published in the journal Neural Computation by Beatrice Alexandra Golomb rejected the idea that a sonic attack was the source of the symptoms and concluded that the facts were consistent with pulsed radiofrequency/microwave radiation (RF/MW) exposure. Golomb wrote that (1) the nature of the noises the diplomats reported was consistent with sounds caused by pulsed RF/MW via the Frey effect; (2) the signs and symptoms the diplomats reported matched symptoms from RF/MW exposure (problems with sleep, cognition, vision, balance, speech; headaches; sensations of pressure or vibration; nosebleeds; brain injury and brain swelling); (3) "oxidative stress provides a documented mechanism of RF/MW injury compatible with reported signs and symptoms"; and (4) in the past, the U.S. embassy in Moscow was subject to a microwave beam called the Moscow Signal. The Moscow Signal was inferred to be a Soviet espionage technique that might have also had health effects. Neuroscientist Allan H. Frey, for whom the Frey effect is named, considers the microwave theory viable.

In December 2020, a study by an expert committee of the U.S. National Academies of Sciences, Engineering, and Medicine, commissioned by the State Department, released its report, concluding, "Overall, directed pulsed RF energy ... appears to be the most plausible mechanism in explaining these cases among those that the committee considered" but that "each possible cause remains speculative" and that "the report should not be viewed as conclusive". Chaired by David Relman, the committee included Linda Birnbaum, Ronald Brookmeyer, Caroline Buckee, Joseph Fins, David A. Whelan, and others. The panel stated that a lack of information and direct evidence (such as medical testing data about affected persons) limited what it could conclude about explanations of the phenomenon. In a 2021 interview with NPR's Sarah McCammon, Relman said that the committee identified "microwave radiation that occurs in a pulsed or intermittent form" as "the most plausible" mechanism for the injuries, but that it could not confidently identify any cause given the lack of "direct evidence that this could explain the entire story for sure or even parts of it." Relman said the committee lacked information to assess "what the various sources of such pulsed microwave energy might be" but that the facts left the committee "with this very sort of disconcerting notion that it had been produced deliberately by other actors whose purposes we really weren't in a position to fathom." Relman said that "the bottom line is that this is still a perplexing story that still needs further investigation."

Multiple anecdotes from various Western diplomats stationed overseas, including in Russia, describe mysterious ailments during past decades that might be due to microwave devices. In 2014, an unclassified NSA report indicated a hostile country in the 1990s possessed a "high powered microwave system weapon that may have the ability to weaken, intimidate or kill an enemy over time and without leaving evidence."

Some scientists, including physicist Peter Zimmerman, bioengineers Kenneth R. Foster and Andrei G. Pakhomov, and UCLA neurologist Robert Baloh, consider the microwave hypothesis implausible; Baloh called the National Academies conclusion "science fiction". Cheryl Rofer, a former chemist at the Los Alamos National Laboratory, said that there were no microwave experts on the NAS committee and that "No evidence has been offered that such a weapon has been developed by any nation." Rofer also cited a 1978 study that found no adverse health effects from the Moscow Signal.

In 2021, a panel of 16 scientists affiliated with the Cuban Academy of Sciences and convened by the Cuban government addressed the microwave hypothesis, writing that "No known form of energy can selectively cause brain damage (with laser-like spatial accuracy) under the conditions described for the alleged incidents in Havana."

Ultrasound weapon
In March 2018, Kevin Fu and a team of computer scientists at the University of Michigan reported in a study that ultrasound—specifically, intermodulation distortion from multiple inaudible ultrasonic signals—from malfunctioning or improperly placed Cuban surveillance equipment could have been the origin of the reported sounds.

Other posibilities

Pesticides or infectious agents
A 2019 study commissioned by Global Affairs Canada of 23 exposed Canadian diplomats, completed in May 2019, found "clinical, imaging, and biochemical evidence consistent with the hypothesis" of overexposure to cholinesterase inhibitors (a class of neurotoxic pesticide) such as organophosphates (OPs) as a cause of brain injury; the embassies and other places in Cuba had been sprayed frequently as an anti-Zika virus mosquito control measure. The study concluded that other possible causes could not be ruled out.

The 2020 National Academies study found that it was unlikely that "acute high-level exposure to OPs and/or pyrethroids contributed" to the illnesses, due to a lack of evidence of exposures to those pesticides or clinical histories consistent with such exposure, but the study committee "could not rule out the possibility, although slight, that exposure to insecticides, particularly OPs, increased susceptibility to the triggering factor(s) that caused the Embassy personnel cases." The National Academies study committee also found it "highly unlikely" that an infectious disease (such as Zika virus, which was an epidemic in Cuba in 2016–17) caused the illnesses.

Cricket noises
In 2017, some U.S. personnel in Havana made audio recordings during incidents associated with Havana syndrome, one of which was obtained by the Associated Press. In January 2019, biologists Alexander L. Stubbs of the University of California, Berkeley and Fernando Montealegre-Z of the University of Lincoln analyzed the recordings and concluded that the sound was caused by the calling song of the Indies short-tailed cricket (Anurogryllus celerinictus) rather than a technological device. Stubbs and Montealegre-Z matched the song's "pulse repetition rate, power spectrum, pulse rate stability, and oscillations per pulse" to the recording. Stubbs and Montealegre wrote, "the causes of the health problems reported by embassy personnel are beyond the scope of this paper" and called for "more rigorous research into the source of these ailments, including the potential psychogenic effects, as well as possible physiological explanations unrelated to sonic attacks." This conclusion was comparable to a 2017 hypothesis from Cuban scientists that the sound on the same recording is from Jamaican field crickets.

In 2018, JASON, a group of physicists and scientists who advise the U.S. government, analyzed audio recordings from eight of the original 21 incidents of Havana syndrome and two cellphone videos taken by one patient from Cuba. It concluded that the sounds in the eight recordings were "most likely" caused by insects and that it was "highly unlikely" that microwaves or ultrasound beams were involved, because "No plausible single source of energy (neither radio/microwaves nor sonic) can produce both the recorded audio/video signals and the reported medical effects." The group determined with "high confidence" that the two videos were sounds from the Indies short-tailed cricket, and also noted a "low confidence" hypothesis that the noises may have been from a concrete vibrating machine with worn bearings. The report's findings were first reported by Reuters in July 2019. Parts of JASON's report were declassified in September 2021. While biomedical engineer Kenneth Foster (an opponent of the microwave theory) cited the findings as evidence against the theory, biomedical engineer James Lin (a proponent of the microwave theory) said that the recordings the JASON report analyzed could not represent actual cases of Havana syndrome, since typical sound recorders cannot record microwaves. The JASON report also concluded, "It cannot be ruled out that while the perceived sounds, while not harmful, are introduced by an adversary as deception so as to mask an entirely unrelated mode of causing illness."

Psychogenic origin
After the initial reports of the incidents in Havana, the FBI's Behavioral Analysis Unit visited the city and came to the assessment that the individuals were experiencing a mass psychogenic illness. The Behavioral Analysis Unit profilers did not speak to any of the affected people directly, instead relying on transcripts of previous interviews that the FBI had conducted with patients. The unit reviewed the patient histories compiled by the patients' neuropsychologists and other physicians, who had already ruled out mass psychogenic illness, noting that "many of the victims didn't know about the other people who were sick, and their bodies couldn't have feigned some of the symptoms they were exhibiting." In November 2018, a previously classified State Department report by the JASON advisory group concluded that while the cause of the condition was unknown, "psychogenic effects may serve to explain important components of the reported injuries."

Ragini Verma, the lead author of a University of Pennsylvania study published in JAMA in 2019 that found brain differences in diplomats, concluded that based on its findings, "a wholly psychogenic or psychosomatic cause was very unlikely." Verma added that she was unable to identify a cause based on brain imaging alone.

A March 2018 editorial in JAMA by two neurologists argued that a functional disorder such as persistent postural-perceptual dizziness ("a syndrome characterized primarily by chronic symptoms of dizziness and perceived unsteadiness, often triggered by acute or chronic vestibular disease, neurological or medical illness or psychological distress") could explain some of the symptoms the diplomats in Cuba experienced.

In a 2019 paper, Robert Bartholomew and Robert Baloh propose that the syndrome represents mass psychogenic illness rather than a "novel clinical entity". They cite the vagueness and inconsistency of symptoms as well as the circumstances they developed in (affected staff would have been under significant stress as the U.S. had just reopened its embassy in Cuba) as a cause. Bartholomew and Baloh co-authored a book, Havana Syndrome: Mass Psychogenic Illness and the Real Story Behind the Embassy Mystery and Hysteria (2020), arguing in support of their hypothesis.

The 2020 National Academies analysis appeared to show that psychological issues were not the likely cause of the injuries, but the different ways people were affected left open the possible influence of psychological and social factors. The report reads, "the likelihood of mass psychogenic illness as an explanation for patients' symptoms had to be established from sufficient evidence" and "could not be inferred merely by the absence of other causal mechanisms or the lack of definitive structural injuries". In its assessment of potential social and psychological causes, the committee notes the possibility of stress-based psychological responses, and that these were more likely to be triggered by potential threats attributed to human sources than other stressors. It concludes that these could not have caused the acute "audio-vestibular" symptoms some patients experienced, such as sudden unexplained sounds. The scope of the provided data limited the committee's ability to investigate psychological and social factors.

Locations associated with Havana Syndrome claims

Cuba

In August 2017, reports began surfacing that American and Canadian diplomatic personnel in Cuba had experienced unusual, unexplained health problems dating to late 2016. As of June 2018, the number of American citizens experiencing symptoms was 26.

Events
The original 21 events in Cuba were characterized as starting with strange grating noises coming from a specific direction. Some people experienced pressure, vibration, or a sensation comparable to driving a car with the window partly rolled down. These noises lasted from 20 seconds to 30 minutes and happened while the diplomats were either at home or in hotel rooms. Other people nearby (including family members and guests in neighboring rooms) did not experience the same symptoms.

Impact on American diplomats
Some U.S. embassy workers have experienced lasting health problems, including an unidentified diplomat who now needs a hearing aid. The U.S. State Department declared that the health problems were either the result of an attack or due to exposure to an unknown device and declared that it was not blaming the Cuban government and would not say who was to blame. Affected people described symptoms such as hearing loss, memory loss, and nausea. Speculation centered around a sonic weapon, with some researchers pointing to infrasound as a possible cause.
 
In August 2017, the United States expelled two Cuban diplomats in retaliation for perceived Cuban responsibility. The next month, the U.S. State Department stated that it was removing non-essential staff from the U.S. embassy and warned U.S. citizens not to travel to Cuba. In October 2017, President Donald Trump said he believed that Cuba was responsible for the occurrences, calling them a "very unusual attack".

In response to the incidents, the U.S. State Department announced in March 2018 that it would continue to staff its embassy in Havana at the minimum level required to perform "core diplomatic and consular functions"; the embassy had been operating under "ordered departure status" since September 2017, but the status was set to expire. This announcement served to extend the staff reductions indefinitely.

U.S. government investigations
In January 2018, the Associated Press reported that a non-public FBI report found no evidence of an intentional sonic attack. A November 2018 report in the New Yorker found that the FBI's investigation into the incidents was stymied by conflict with the CIA and the State Department; the CIA was reluctant to reveal, even to other U.S. government agencies, the identities of affected officers because of concern about possible leaks. Federal rules on the privacy of employee medical records also hindered the investigation.

In January 2018, at the direction of Secretary of State Rex Tillerson, the State Department convened an accountability review board, which is "an internal State Department mechanism to review security incidents involving diplomatic personnel." Retired United States Ambassador to Libya Peter Bodde was chosen to lead the board.

Impact on Canadian diplomats
In March 2018, MRI scans and other tests taken by a chief neurologist in Pittsburgh on an unspecified number of Canadian diplomats showed evidence of brain damage that mirrored the injuries some of their American counterparts had faced. In early 2018, Global Affairs Canada ended family postings to Cuba and withdrew all staff with families. Several of the Canadians who were affected in 2017 were reported to still be unable to resume their work due to the severity of their ailments. The lack of knowledge of the cause of Havana syndrome, had made it challenging for the Royal Canadian Mounted Police to investigate.

In 2019, the Canadian government announced that it was reducing its embassy staff in Havana after a 14th Canadian diplomat reported symptoms of Havana syndrome in late December 2018. In February 2019, several Canadian diplomats sued the Canadian government, arguing that it failed to protect them or promptly address serious health concerns. The government has sought to dismiss the suit, arguing in November 2019 that it was not negligent and did not breach its duties to its employees. In court filings, the government acknowledged that several of the 14 plaintiffs in the suit had concussion-like symptoms but said that no definitive cause or medical diagnosis had been ascertained. In a November 2019 statement, Global Affairs Canada said, "We continue to investigate the potential causes of the unusual health symptoms."

Cuban government reactions
After the incident was made public, the Cuban foreign minister accused the U.S. of lying about the incident and denied Cuban involvement in or knowledge of the cause of the health problems the diplomats experienced.

The Cuban government offered to cooperate with the U.S. in an investigation of the incidents. It employed about 2,000 scientists and law enforcement officers who interviewed 300 neighbors of diplomats, examined two hotels, and medically examined non-diplomats who could have been exposed. NBC reported that Cuban officials stated that they analyzed air and soil samples and considered a range of toxic chemicals. They also examined the possibility that electromagnetic waves were to blame, and even looked into whether insects could be the culprit, but found nothing they could link to the claimed medical symptoms. The FBI and Cuban authorities met to discuss the situation; the Cubans stated that the U.S. neither agreed to share the diplomats' medical records with Cuban authorities nor allowed Cuban investigators access to U.S. diplomats' homes to conduct tests. In 2021, a panel of 16 scientists affiliated with the Cuban Academy of Sciences and convened by the Cuban government reported that "the narrative of the 'mysterious syndrome' is not scientifically acceptable in any of its components." The panel addressed the microwave hypothesis directly, writing, "No known form of energy can selectively cause brain damage (with laser-like spatial accuracy) under the conditions described for the alleged incidents in Havana."

Upon release of the March 2023 US intelligence agencies' unclassified report which concluded that, "available intelligence consistently points against the involvement of US adversaries in causing the reported incidents" and that the involvement of a foreign adversary was "very unlikely", Cuba's Vice Foreign Minister Carlos Fernandez de Cossio told Reuters that, "The unfortunate thing is, the U.S. government leveraged (Havana Syndrome) to derail bilateral relations ... and discredit Cuba." The Reuters article goes on to report that "Cuba has for years labeled as 'science fiction' the idea that ´Havana Syndrome´ resulted from an attack by a foreign agent, and its top scientists in 2021 found no evidence of such allegations."

Studies
At the request of the U.S. government, University of Pennsylvania researchers examined 21 affected diplomats posted to Cuba, and the preliminary results were published in the Journal of the American Medical Association (JAMA) in March 2018. The researchers found "no evidence of white matter tract abnormalities" in affected diplomats beyond what might be seen in a control group of the same age and described "a new syndrome in the diplomats that resembles persistent concussion." While some of those affected recovered swiftly, others had symptoms for months. The study concluded that "the diplomats appear to have sustained injury to widespread brain networks."

The editorial board of the journal Cortex published an editorial referring to the JAMA research's "gross methodological flaws" and registering concern that it had been published. In the board's view, "Allowing such confused and conflicting explanations of methodology and analysis to pass unchallenged is a slippery path for science, and dangerous for society at large".

In response to a December 2017 State Department request, the U.S. Centers for Disease Control and Prevention conducted a "Cuba Unexplained Events Investigation." The two-year investigation of the medical records of 95 U.S. diplomats and family members in Havana who reported symptoms resulted in a final report, marked for official use only, dated December 2019.

In January 2021, both BuzzFeed News and George Washington University's National Security Archive obtained the report, pursuant to Freedom of Information Act requests. (Some material in the released report was redacted for medical privacy reasons.) The CDC developed a "case definition" of the Havana syndrome, consisting of a biphasic (two-stage) syndrome. The first phase of symptoms (sometimes closely after an auditory or sensory event) consisted of one or more of the following symptoms: head pressure, disorientation, nausea or headache, vestibular disturbance, or auditory or visual syndromes. The second phase of symptoms, occurring sometime later, consisted of cognitive deficits, vestibular disturbances, or both. The report concluded, "Of the 95 persons whose medical records CDC evaluated, 15 had illnesses that met the criteria for a presumptive case definition. CDC classified 31 others as possible cases and the remaining 49 as not likely to be a case." Two years later, six of the subjects in the CDC investigation were still being rehabilitated for their injuries, and four were still unable to return to work. The CDC decided not to conduct a retrospective case–control study because of the length of time between the event and the onset of symptoms, which could lead to recall and selection biases that "could generate misleading or obscured findings."

The CDC concluded, "The evaluations conducted thus far have not identified a mechanism of injury, process of exposure, effective treatment, or mitigating factor for the unexplained cluster of symptoms experienced by those stationed in Havana."

In late 2022 the US Defense Health Agency issued Form 244, Anomalous Health Incident (AHI) Acute Assessment, described as "a multi-domain assessment that should be used to evaluate patients for potential AHI".

Beyond Cuba
Beginning in late 2017, suspected attacks targeting U.S. intelligence personnel were reported in an expanding set of locations around the world, including Moscow, Russia; Tbilisi, Georgia; Poland; Taiwan; and Australia. Other reports came from Colombia, Kyrgyzstan, Uzbekistan, and Austria, among other countries.

The U.S. government has not released the number of affected persons, but media reporting indicated a total of 130 possible cases by the end of May 2021, rising to more than 200 possible cases by mid-September 2021. The cases variously affected CIA, U.S. military, and State Department personnel and their family members. Some reports, after investigation, were determined to be possibly related to Havana syndrome, while others were determined to be unrelated; BBC News reported in 2021 that "One former official reckons around half the cases reported by US officials are possibly linked to attacks by an adversary."

Guangzhou, China

Starting in early 2018, U.S. diplomats in China began reporting symptoms consistent with Havana syndrome. The first such incident was reported by an American diplomat in China in April 2018 at the Guangzhou consulate, the largest U.S. consulate in China. The employee reported that he had been experiencing symptoms since late 2017. Several individuals were taken to the U.S. for medical examination. A USAID employee at the U.S. embassy in Tashkent, Uzbekistan, reported a different incident in September 2017; the employee's report was discounted by the U.S. State Department.

Answering questions from the House Foreign Affairs Committee in May 2018, Secretary of State Mike Pompeo testified that U.S. diplomatic staff in Guangzhou had reported symptoms "very similar" to, and "entirely consistent" with, those reported from Cuba. On June 6, 2018, The New York Times reported that at least two additional U.S. diplomats stationed at the Guangzhou consulate had been evacuated from China and reported that "it remains unclear whether the illnesses are the result of attacks at all. Other theories have included toxins, listening devices that accidentally emitted harmful sounds, or even mass hysteria." In June 2018, the State Department announced that a task force had been assembled to investigate the reports and expanded their health warning to all of mainland China amid reports some US diplomats outside of Guangzhou had experienced the same symptoms resembling a brain injury. The warning told anyone who experienced "unusual acute auditory or sensory phenomena accompanied by unusual sounds or piercing noises" to "not attempt to locate their source."

Washington, D.C., area
In 2019, a White House official reported experiencing debilitating symptoms while walking her dog in a Virginia suburb of Washington; the incident was publicly reported in 2020. In November 2020, a similar incident was reported on The Ellipse, a lawn adjacent to the south side of the White House. Both incidents were similar to those that were reported to have struck dozens of U.S. personnel overseas, including CIA and State Department personnel. Federal agencies investigated the incident at The Ellipse, and Defense Department officials briefed members of the Senate Armed Services Committee and House Armed Services Committee in April 2021. Investigators told members of Congress that they had not been able to determine the cause of the events or who was responsible.

Elsewhere in Asia
In August 2021, it was reported that two American diplomats were evacuated from the U.S. Embassy in Hanoi, Vietnam, after incidents of Havana syndrome were reported. These reported cases also delayed Vice President Kamala Harris's visit to Vietnam.

In September 2021, a CIA aide-de-camp of chief William J. Burns reported symptoms consistent with those of Havana syndrome on a diplomatic visit to India.

Europe

In 2021, dozens of U.S. personnel stationed in Vienna, including diplomats, intelligence officials, and some children of U.S. employees, had Havana syndrome-like symptoms. The State Department confirmed in July 2021 that it was investigating the reports. The Austrian foreign ministry stated it was collaborating with American investigators. Aside from Havana, Vienna has reported the most incidents. While no suspects were named for the Vienna cases, it has been noted that Vienna was hosting indirect talks between the United States and Iran on reviving the 2015 Iran deal. In September 2021, the CIA station chief in Vienna (the top U.S. intelligence officer in the country) was recalled over concerns over his management; he had been criticized for not taking quicker action in response to the Havana syndrome cases at his post.

In the months preceding August 2021, cases of Havana syndrome were reported at the U.S. embassy in Berlin, Germany, including from two U.S. officials who sought medical treatment. Several new cases were reported at the embassy in October 2021.

In 2021, the CIA evacuated an intelligence officer serving in Serbia suspected of being a victim of the neurological attack.

Three White House staffers reported symptoms at the InterContinental London Park Lane in late May 2019.

Elsewhere
One of the CIA officials with symptoms in Australia and Taiwan was one of the agency's top five-ranking officials. The Russian embassy in Australia dismissed reports of Russian operatives targeting CIA personnel in Australia.

In October 2021, it was reported that U.S. embassy personnel and their families in Bogota, Colombia, had developed symptoms consistent with Havana syndrome.

Legislative responses 
In response to Havana syndrome, U.S. Senator Susan Collins introduced a bill (S. 1828), co-sponsored by a bipartisan group of nine other senators, that would close a loophole in the Federal Employees' Compensation Act that would normally not cover damage to organs such as the brain and heart. The Helping American Victims Afflicted by Neurological Attacks (HAVANA) Act authorized the CIA Director and the Secretary of State to provide financial support for personnel with brain injuries. The bill passed the House on a 427–0 vote, passed the Senate by unanimous consent, and was signed into law by President Joe Biden on October 8, 2021, becoming Public Law No. 117-46. An appropriation for the funding authorized by the HAVANA Act has not been passed, but has been included in drafts of a Defense Department appropriations bill.

The National Defense Authorization Act for Fiscal Year 2022, passed by Congress in December 2021, included a section directing the president to designate a senior official as "anomalous health incidents interagency coordinator" to oversee efforts across the federal government and to coordinate with the White House Office of Science and Technology Policy; required relevant federal agencies to designate a specific high-level "anomalous health incident agency coordination lead"; and directed agencies to develop guidance to employees considered to be at risk of exposure.

Animal experimentation
Despite the March 2023 U.S. government report calling into question its earlier claims that Havana syndrome resulted from energy weapon attacks, in early March 2023, it was reported that "The Pentagon is funding experiments on animals, exposing them for extended period of time to RF energy, in an attempt to recreate 'Havana Syndrome'". Entities funded to perform the research include Wayne State University and the Henry M. Jackson Foundation for the Advancement of Military Medicine.

On 13 March 2023, PETA demanded that the Pentagon end live-animal testing in relation to Havana syndrome, saying that "Such a prohibition should apply to...an apparent military plan to expose monkeys to pulsed microwave radiation in a misguided attempt to determine human brain effected associated with an acquired neurosensory syndrome, commonly referred to as 'Havana syndrome.'"

See also 

 Brown note
 Cuba–United States relations
 Directed-energy weapon
 Electronic harassment
 Moscow Signal
 Russia–United States relations

References

2016 in Cuba
2017 in Cuba
2018 in Cuba
21st century in Havana
Ailments of unknown cause
Russia intelligence operations
Fringe physics
Canada–Cuba relations
Canada–China relations
Canada–Russia relations
Canada–United States relations
China–United States relations
Cuba–United States relations
Russia–United States relations
Animal testing